The Presidential Recordings and Materials Preservation Act (PRMPA) of 1974 (codified at , note) is an act of Congress enacted in the wake of the August 1974 resignation of President Richard M. Nixon.  It placed Nixon's presidential records into federal custody to prevent their destruction.  The legislative action was intended to reduce secrecy, while allowing historians to fulfill their responsibilities.

Application
The Act applies only to President Nixon's presidential materials.  Under the statute, materials related to the Abuse of Governmental Power  and the constitutional and statutory duties of the President and his White House staff are retained by the National Archives.  The Act mandates that the National Archives preserve and process these materials, and prepare them for public access.  The National Archives was required to segregate and return to Nixon's estate those  materials identified as purely "personal-private" or "personal-political" and unrelated to the President's  constitutional and statutory duties.  The U.S. Supreme Court upheld the Act's constitutionality in Nixon v. Administrator of General Services.

Legislative history

See also
 Presidential Records Act
 Richard Nixon Presidential Library and Museum
 Executive Order 13233

References

External links
 Presidential Recordings and Materials Preservation Act (PRMPA) of 1974 at the U.S. National Archives
  Nixon Presidential Materials at the Nixon Library
 

1974 in law
United States federal government administration legislation 
93rd United States Congress